King Abdullah Sports City, also nicknamed The Shining Jewel or simply The Jewel, is a multi-use stadium and sports city located 30 kilometers north of Jeddah, Saudi Arabia. The City was named after Abdullah, King of Saudi Arabia when the stadium opened. 

The main stadium (King Abdullah International Stadium) is used for football, reaching a full capacity of 62,241 spectators. It is the biggest stadium in Jeddah, and the second biggest in Saudi Arabia, coming after Riyadh's King Fahd Stadium. Additionally, it is the 10th biggest stadium in the Arab world. Accompanying the innovative stadium are smaller sports venues surrounding the main stadium. It also hosts athletics and indoor sporting events in indoor arenas.

The bid for the construction was won by Saudi Aramco and the contractor for this project was a joint venture between Al Muhaidib Contracting Company and Belgian construction company BESIX Group.

The contract for providing the stadium safety, security, traffic management and contingency plans was awarded to a UK Company,  Crowd Management UK Limited (http://www.crowd-management-ltd.com) who are also the lead security and traffic management consultants for The R&A who host The Open Championship annually. In addition to the written plans Crowd Management UK delivered a training course for key stadium operators at the Saudi Aramco training facility in Jeddah KSA.

The company also provided an independent evaluation of the performance of local staff and the event safety officer (provided by Sword Security) during the inaugural event at the KASC stadium. This led to a significant number of safety and security recommendations and the appointment of a dedicated Stadium Manager.

The stadium surface is paspalum turfgrass marketed as Pure Dynasty Seeded Paspalum and provided by Atlas Turf International.

Background and construction
The idea of a new large stadium in the city of Jeddah was put and considered in the late 90s, and was always anticipated by Saudi football fans. In 2012, the new stadium's construction began. Before the stadium was launched officially in 2014, Jeddah's main stadium was Prince Abdullah Al Faisal Stadium, accommodating a capacity of 24,000 and hosting numerous great matches and events in Saudi football history throughout decades.

Designed and delivered by Arup Associates' architects and delivered by Arup's engineers.

Opening ceremony
The city opened officially on May 1, 2014 hosting the final of the 2014 King's Cup tournament between Jeddah's Al-Ahli SC and Riyadh's Al-Shabab. In a hometown upset, Al-Shabab won 3–0, and were crowned their 3rd King's Cup championship. The match was attended by then-King Abdullah, along with then-Crown Prince Salman and then-Deputy Crown Prince Muqrin.

For this Inaugural fixture safety and security plans were designed and implemented by Mr. Sol N'Jie and Mr. David Storr representing Sword Security, based in Ireland. Mr. Storr was the event safety officer.

Over 62,241 diverse fans filled the stadium. The tickets for the match were free, which resulted in many citizens resorting to black market, some even buying and selling tickets for as much as 2,500 Saudi Riyals. It was also reported that many fans were able to enter without any tickets and the capacity could not be accurately counted.

There were numerous casualties as a result of crowd disorder and flares and objects rained down on the playing surface when the opposing teams and officials emerged to inspect the playing surface.  Saudi football enthusiasts have voiced their displeasure regarding this, and many believed that the event was unorganised.

After the match, a traditional Saudi Arabian festival was held on the pitch. During the ceremony, 10-year-old boy Faisal Al-Ghamdi presented a crystal ball to the King. He then received a gift from the King, a luxurious pen. In an interview following the ceremony, Al-Ghamdi told Okaz newspaper that "It was the most valuable gift I have received all my life." Al-Ghamdi said he was honored to be selected for this task and to greet the King. "It was one of my dreams to stand before Custodian of the Two Holy Mosques. And with this, I’ve achieved it," he said. Al-Ghamdi was selected among 170 children for his part in the ceremony. The King of Saudi Arabia later gave a speech acknowledging his people, congratulating them, and saying that they "deserve so much more". The ceremony lasted an hour and a half and ended with fireworks. It was considered to be one of the greatest sports-related events in the history of Saudi Arabia. The music for the ceremony was composed by Max Herman.

Facilities
Outside the main stadium, the city has three separate football fields and four small indoor arenas also used for football. It also has six tennis courts, and a large indoor arena for sports and other purposes. The city also has a main mosque, and six separate smaller mosques. The city is also equipped with a comprehensive media center, in which spacious rooms are used to broadcast press conferences for players, coaches, and football personalities.

Tickets and seating capacity
The main stadium can fit up to more than 63,241 in attendance. Seats and stands are numbered and divided in a professional way. The lower section of the stadium (L) contains 38 blocks accommodating 631 seats per block with a total of 24,000 seats. The middle section (M) contains 48 blocks accommodating 500 seats per block with a total of 24,000 seats. The upper and smallest section (U) has 48 blocks accommodating 291 seats per block with a total of 14,000 seats. The stadium also holds hundreds of private seats and car parking spots reserved to those of special needs.
The Maximum Viewers witnessed was for Brazil national football team Vs Argentina national football team with 62,345. 
Ticket prices for events and matches vary between 30–45 Saudi Riyals for normal seats, and 300–1,500 Saudi Riyals for VIP seats. Ticketing system has evolved and is becoming well organised. In September 2014, an online ticketing website named MAKANI (Arabic: مكاني 'my place') was launched. It allowed citizens to book, pay, and formally print their tickets for matches and other events. It has received wide praise for being efficient and easy to use.

Records
As of April 2, 2017:
 The first match held at the stadium was between Al-Ahli and Al-Shabab in the 2014 King's Cup final on May 1, 2014.
 The first game win and championship win in the stadium was for Al-Shabab on May 1, 2014.
 The biggest attendance was 62,241 fans in the opening ceremony between Al-Ahli and Al-Shabab on May 1, 2014.
 The biggest attendance in the Saudi League was 60,134 fans in a match between Jeddah's Al-Ittihad and Riyadh's Al-Hilal on December 1, 2014. The match ended 0–0.
 The first local derby was between Al-Ahli and Al-Ittihad on December 19, 2014, in the Saudi League. The match ended 1–1, with over 59,026 fans in attendance.
 Al-Ahli have the most wins in the stadium with 52 overall wins.
 Al-Ittihad have the most losses in the stadium with 19 overall losses.
 Al-Ahli and Al-Ittihad have the most draws in the stadium with 15 overall draws.
 Fernando Menegazzo scored the first goal at the stadium, from a penalty kick on May 1, 2014.
 The first goal scored from open play was for Al-Shabab's Muhannad Assiri, on May 1, 2014.
 The first hat-trick scored at the stadium was by Omar Al Soma, in a match against Hajer on August 16, 2014.
 The first red card was endured by Al-Ahli's defender Ageel Balghaith on May 1, 2014.
 Saudi Arabia beat East Timor 7–0, on September 3, 2015, to record the biggest win for a home team.
 The heaviest defeat suffered by a home team was on May 8, 2016, when Al Ittihad lost 5–0 to Al-Nassr.
 The highest scoring match was on February 4, 2016, between Al-Ittihad and Al-Raed which ended 6–2, with 8 goals being scored. The record was equaled on September 30, 2017, when Al-Ahli face Al-Raed which ended 5–3, with 8 goals being scored.
 The Record for the Biggest attendance now Hold, 62,345 Viewers for the @Superclásico de las Américas between Argentina VS Brazil.

Other events

WWE
The stadium hosted WWE's Greatest Royal Rumble event on April 27, 2018. The event featured the first ever 50-man Royal Rumble match, with Braun Strowman being declared the winner and the Greatest Royal Rumble Champion after last eliminating Big Cass.

The event was a part of a 10-year strategic multi-platform partnership between WWE and the Saudi General Sports Authority in support of Saudi Vision 2030, Saudi Arabia's social and economic reform program.

WWE returned to Jeddah on June 7, 2019 with Super ShowDown, which featured the first ever 50-man Battle Royal. The Undertaker and Goldberg competed in the main event.

Boxing 
On October 8, 2017 a deal was agreed for the complex to host the final of the World Boxing Super Series: Cruiserweight tournament in May 2018.

In February 2018, the final was set to be Oleksandr Usyk vs. Murat Gassiev. May 11 was the date that was set for the final, however in April, Usyk suffered a minor injury to his left elbow and ultimately the final was rescheduled to take place on July 21 in Moscow, Russia. Usyk won the fight via a dominant unanimous decision.

On July 5, it was rumoured the WBSS super middleweight final between George Groves vs. Callum Smith, an all-British fight, would not take place in the UK and likely to take place in Jeddah. Both boxers made their opinions known that it was not ideal the final should take place Jeddah as it would be much bigger in the UK, however there was no complaints from either side. There was more frustration at the bout being postponed. The final was announced to take place on September 28 at a 10,000 capacity arena at the Complex.

A heavyweight boxing match dubbed 'Rage on the Red Sea' sees Oleksandr Usyk and Anthony Joshua fighting for the second time. This fight was confirmed for the King Abdullah Sports City in Jeddah as of June 2022, Usyk was the winner of their first fight which happened in London, England during September 2021. This rematch is Joshua's second professional fight in Saudi Arabia, he previously fought Andy Ruiz Jr. in the 'Clash on the Dunes' at the Diriyah arena during 2019. The boxing match is set to take place on Saturday the 20th of August 2022 with a maincard including the first all female boxing fight in Saudi Arabia.

See also
 List of things named after Saudi Kings
 List of association football stadiums by capacity

References

External links

Football venues in Saudi Arabia
Indoor arenas in Saudi Arabia
Sports venues completed in 2014
Multi-purpose stadiums in Saudi Arabia
2014 establishments in Saudi Arabia